Church View is an unincorporated community in Middlesex County, Virginia, United States. Church View has a post office with ZIP code 23032, which opened on May 20, 1852.

References

Unincorporated communities in Middlesex County, Virginia
Unincorporated communities in Virginia